Rhinopetitia myersi is a species of characin endemic to Brazil, where it is found in the Rio Araguaia.  This species can reach a length of  SL.

References

Characidae
Fish of South America
Fish of Brazil
Endemic fauna of Brazil
Fish described in 1964